PureNRG are a live electronic music act, composed of members Solarstone and Giuseppe Ottaviani.

Biography 
The name of the act was derived from Solarstone's 'Pure Trance' label, and Giuseppe's previous act 'Nu NRG'.

The duo began producing and performing together in 2015, and have since performed in clubs and at festivals regularly. When performing live, they use a custom designed set-up including many of the instruments and much of the equipment used to produce their music in the studio.

In 2016 they released the track 'Secret of the Sahara', which utilises a sample of a track by the same name, originally composed by Ennio Morricone. This was notable as Ennio has not allowed any of his music to be utilised in electronic music in over 20 years.

Discography 
 Singles

References 

British electronic music groups
British trance music groups
Italian electronic music groups
Italian trance music groups
2015 establishments in the United Kingdom
2015 establishments in Italy